Edward Nash may refer to:

Edward Nash (painter) (1778–1821), English painter, known for his miniatures
Edward Radcliffe-Nash (1888–1915), English equestrian
Edward Nash (sportsman) (1902–1985), English cricketer and footballer 
Eddie Nash (born 1929), American nightclub owner

See also
Edwin Nash (1813–1884), English ecclesiastical architect
Ted Nash (disambiguation)